Andreea Mitu and Alicja Rosolska were the defending champions, but Mitu chose not to participate this year. Rosolska played alongside Oksana Kalashnikova, but lost in the semifinals to Quirine Lemoine and Arantxa Rus.

Lemoine and Rus went on to win the title, defeating María Irigoyen and Barbora Krejčíková in the final 3–6, 6–3, [10–8].

Seeds

Draw

Draw

External Links
Main Draw

Swedish Open - Doubles
Swedish Open